The Poetry Society of America's George Bogin Memorial Award is given "by the family and friends of George Bogin for a selection of four or five poems that use language in an original way to reflect the encounter of the ordinary and the extraordinary and to take a stand against oppression in any of its forms."

Each winner receives a $500 prize.

Winners
2001: Brian Henry
2002: Kevin Prufer, Judge: Jill Bialosky
2003: Susan Terris, Judge: Sonia Sanchez
2004: Kevin Prufer, Judge: Tory Dent
2005: G.C. Waldrep
2006: Kevin Prufer, Judge: Marie Howe
2007: Wayne Miller, Judge: Eleni Sikelianos
2008: Theresa Sotto, Judge: Prageeta Sharma
2009: Rusty Morrison, Judge: John Yau
2010: Sawnie Morris, Judge: Hettie Jones
2011: Suji Kwock Kim, Judge: Aimee Nezhukumatathil, Finalists: Hadara Bar-Nadav, Rebecca Morgan Frank, Leslie Williams
2012: Suji Kwock Kim, Judge: Evie Shockley, Finalists: Rebecca Morgan Frank, Mary Morris
2013: Paula Bohince, Judge: Cate Marvin, Finalists: Jamaal May, Lucy Ricciardi
2014: Gary Young, Judge: Jessica Greenbaum, Finalists: Meena Alexander and Jane Wong
2015: Dean Rader, Judge: Stephen Burt, Finalists: Nina Puro and Diana Khoi Nguyen 
2016: Adam O. Davis, Judge: Eduardo Corral, Finalists: Shara Lessley and Purvi Shah 
2017: Marie La Viña, Judge: Victoria Redel, Finalists: Beth Bachmann, Kai Carlson-Wee, Aidan Forster, and Brian Tierney
2018: Brian Tierney, Judge: Daniel Borzutzky, Finalists Catherine Imbriglio and Cate Lycurgus
2019: Sarah Henning
2020: JinJin Xu

Notes

See also
 Poetry Society of America
 List of American literary awards
 List of poetry awards
 List of years in poetry

External links
 Poetry Society of America main awards Web page

American poetry awards
Awards established in 2001
2001 establishments in the United States